Clemson Tigers softball joined the Atlantic Coast Conference as a Division I varsity program in 2020.  In November 2017, former Stanford coach John Rittman was named as Clemson's first head softball coach. Rittman spent the previous two years as an assistant coach at Kansas and USA Softball.

History

Coaching history

2020s
The Tigers' first season was impacted by the coronavirus pandemic. The Tigers had started 19–8 overall and 5–1 in ACC play before the season was cancelled by Clemson and the ACC. The NCAA tournament was also canceled. 2021 was Clemson's first full season as a program and they finished 44–8 overall, with a 29–5 record in ACC play. They won the regular season championship, and made the final of the ACC tournament but fell short in the final, losing to Duke. They could not advance past the Regional in the NCAA Tournament. They were placed in a Regional with SEC champion Alabama and lost both games against the Crimson Tide. The program's success would continue in 2022 as they would finish 14–10 in ACC play to finish in fifth place. Despite their lower seed, they again reached the final of the ACC tournament, but could not overcome Florida State in the Final. They were selected to host a regional in the NCAA Tournament and won three games without allowing a run, to advance to the Super Regional. During the 2023 season, Clemson had its first perfect game in program history.

Coaching staff

Year-by-year record

Awards

All-Americans
 NCFA 1st Team: Valerie Cagle (2022)
 NCFA 2nd Team:  Valerie Cagle (2021)

Conference Awards
ACC Player of the Year – Valerie Cagle (2021)
ACC Freshman of the Year – Valerie Cagle (2021)
ACC Coach of the Year – John Rittman (2021)

See also
List of NCAA Division I softball programs

References